Southport railway station serves the town of Southport, Merseyside, England. The station is the terminal of the Southport branch of the Northern Line of the electric Merseyrail network and the diesel-operated Manchester-Southport Line. It is the fourth busiest station on the Merseyrail network.

History
The Liverpool line was originally built in 1848 by the Liverpool, Crosby and Southport Railway to a temporary station at Eastbank Street, about half a mile short of the current terminus. The current station opened as Southport Chapel Street on 22 August 1851 and became the terminus for all trains in 1857, when passenger services were transferred from the adjacent .

From 1882 the West Lancashire Railway to Preston Fishergate Hill operated from Southport Derby Road (later known as Southport Central) outside Chapel Street Station.

In 1884, another line from Southport to Liverpool opened: the Cheshire Lines Committee's (CLC) North Liverpool Extension Line from Liverpool Central to Southport Lord Street. These lines ultimately proved uncompetitive, however, and the Southport services were withdrawn in January 1952.

In July 1897, both the West Lancashire and the Liverpool, Southport and Preston Junction Railways were absorbed into the Lancashire and Yorkshire Railway (L&Y). The L&Y had a large terminus at Southport Chapel Street and could see no sense in operating two termini at very close proximity. On 1 May 1901, the L&Y completed a remodelling of the approach lines to Southport Central to allow trains to divert onto the Manchester to Southport line and into Southport Chapel Street Station. Southport Central was closed to passengers, and it became a goods depot, eventually amalgamating with Chapel Street depot. It survived intact well into the 1970s.

The Preston line was closed to passengers on 7 September 1964, although a small section to Hesketh Park station was used for freight until 1967.  This line had its electric local services to Crossens and its through steam services withdrawn on consecutive days immediately before the official closure date - the only such route to suffer that fate during the Beeching-era closures. Nowadays, the towns of Southport and Preston are linked only by the (largely dual-carriageway) A565 and A59 roads.

At its largest, Chapel Street station had eleven regular platforms and two excursion platforms.  Now six truncated platforms are in use (platforms 1-3 for Liverpool trains & 4-6 for Manchester), the rest having been demolished and the land used for car parking. In 1970 the former terminal building was replaced with a shopping centre. Platform 7 was originally going to be saved and used as an excursion platform for when mainline specials were to visit the resort, but this failed, and it, too, was demolished along with platforms 8, 9 & 10.

Remains of the signal box, carriage & wagon works & substation are still visible today.

The sidings next to the former South Curve still remain today but are not much used except for if a unit or engine needs turning.

A new M to Go shop opened in 2007, incorporating a ticket office, and the station itself underwent a £3.5 million renovation project which included a renewed roof, new lighting, glazed screens, floor tiles and toilets, plus a retail unit.

Facilities 

The main entrance to this staffed station is located on the pedestrianised Chapel Street, one of Southport's main shopping areas. The car park immediately next to the station is reserved for taxis and staff only, but a large pay car park further along London Street is available for general public use.

The station is staffed 15 minutes before the first service and 15 minutes after the last service. There are toilets, platform CCTV and a Mtogo shop & booking office. There are departure and arrival screens on the platform for passenger information. There are cycle racks for 16 cycles and secure storage for 80 cycles.

Services

Merseyrail 

Monday to Saturday, trains depart every 15 minutes to Hunts Cross via Liverpool Central.

Fewer trains operate on Sundays, with the frequency reduced to one service every 30 minutes, except during the summer, when the service is four trains per hour, two of these services terminate at Liverpool Central, with the remaining two continuing to Hunts Cross.

Merseyrail services can utilise only the electrified platforms. These are Platforms 1, 2 and 3. Platforms 2 and 3 are used more frequently than Platform 1.

Northern Trains 

On Sundays, there is an hourly service to Blackburn via Wigan and Manchester Victoria.

Direct service to stations on the Atherton line only operates in the weekday peaks, and passengers wishing to travel towards Rochdale and further east have to change at Wigan Wallgate (and sometimes cross the street to neighbouring Wigan North Western, as certain trains start/terminate there). The Sunday service pattern remains unchanged.

From the December 2022 timetable change, services to Alderley Edge stopped and now terminate at Manchester Oxford Road.

Northern Trains services normally depart from platforms 4, 5 or 6, although services can also use platform 3 if required.

References

External links

'Altcar Bob' at southport.gb.com

Railway stations in the Metropolitan Borough of Sefton
DfT Category D stations
Buildings and structures in Southport
Former Lancashire and Yorkshire Railway stations
Railway stations served by Merseyrail
Northern franchise railway stations
Railway stations in Great Britain opened in 1851